Petra Marieka Jacoba Hogewoning (born 26 March 1986) is a Dutch retired football defender. She played for clubs in the Netherlands, Russia, the United States and Germany, as well as for the Netherlands women's national football team.

Club career
In 2006–07 Hogewoning helped VV Ter Leede win the double in the last season of the pre-Eredivisie Vrouwen era. She moved to FC Utrecht for the start of the new competition, but missed most of 2007–08 with torn cruciate ligaments.

She signed for German Bundesliga side FCR Duisburg in 2011. In 2012, she joined the newly formed AFC Ajax women's team, where she remained for almost four years. She retired from football in May 2016 after Ajax's KNVB Women's Cup final defeat by ADO Den Haag.

International career
On 6 August 2004 Hogewoning debuted for the senior Netherlands women's national football team, playing the first half of a 2–0 defeat to Japan in Zeist.

Hogewoning played in every match as the Netherlands reached the semi-final of UEFA Women's Euro 2009.

In October 2012 she suffered another anterior cruciate ligament injury, which cost her a place in the Dutch squad for UEFA Women's Euro 2013.

References

External links
Profile at Onsoranje.nl (in Dutch)
Profile at vrouwenvoetbalnederland.nl (in Dutch)
Profile at uefa.com

1986 births
Living people
Footballers from Katwijk
Dutch women's footballers
Netherlands women's international footballers
2015 FIFA Women's World Cup players
FIFA Century Club
Women's Professional Soccer players
Expatriate women's footballers in Russia
Expatriate women's soccer players in the United States
Expatriate women's footballers in Germany
Eredivisie (women) players
FC Utrecht (women) players
Zvezda 2005 Perm players
NJ/NY Gotham FC players
FCR 2001 Duisburg players
AFC Ajax (women) players
Women's association football defenders
Dutch expatriate women's footballers
Dutch expatriate sportspeople in Russia
Dutch expatriate sportspeople in Germany
Dutch expatriate sportspeople in the United States
Ter Leede players